(also written 2012 KP24) is a Chelyabinsk-sized near-Earth asteroid with an observation arc of only 5 days and has a modestly determined orbit for an object of its size. Nominally the asteroid is expected to pass  from Earth and brighten to around apparent magnitude 21.6.

The asteroid is estimated to be  in diameter. It will next come to perihelion (closest approach to the Sun) around 4 July 2023. It has an orbital uncertainty parameter of 6.

2012
It was discovered on 23 May 2012 by the Mount Lemmon Survey at an apparent magnitude of 20.8 using a  reflecting telescope. On 28 May 2012 at 15:20 UT, the asteroid passed  from the center-point of Earth. It then reached perihelion on 2 July 2012. It was removed from the Sentry Risk Table on 8 August 2013 after Sentry updated to planetary ephemeris (DE431).

2032
Newer versions of Sentry returned the object to the risk table. Virtual clones of the asteroid that fit the uncertainty region in the known trajectory show a 1 in 2.1 million chance that the asteroid could impact Earth on 2032 May 28.

References

External links 
 
 
 

Minor planet object articles (unnumbered)

20120528
20230531
20120523
Discoveries by MLS